Lian Island is the largest island in Lianyun District, Lianyungang, Jiangsu, China. The island is located inside Haizhou Bay in the Yellow Sea. The longest sea dyke nationally ( long) connects the island with the east of the city of Lianyungang. Lian Island is the only AAAA-class seashore tourist attraction in Jiangsu. The island was formerly known as Yingyou hill.

Climate 

Lian Island is on the southern edge of the temperate zone, which results in its subtropical monsoon maritime climate. With distinct seasons and pleasant weather, climates here are humid due to the influence of the sea. The average annual temperature is 14 °C (57.2 Degrees Fahrenheit) with the highest average temperature in August at 26.8 °C (80.24 Degrees Fahrenheit) and the lowest in January at 1.1 °C. (33.98 Degrees Fahrenheit)

Throughout the year, there are approximately 223 days having an average temperature of 10 °C or even higher and an average rainfall of 882.6 mm.

Places of interest

Dashawan 

Dashawan, a natural beach, is situated in the middle of Lian Island. It is about 1800 meters long and averagely 150 meters wide, which makes it the largest beach in Jiangsu Province. Considering its fine sandy beaches, clean water and moderate temperature, Dashawan is regarded as one of the best beaches in eastern China.

Seashore Boardwalk 

The Seashore Boardwalk is 2000 meters long, stretching to Dashawan in the west and Sumawan  in the east. Along the Seashore Boardwalk orderly lies the Forest Park, the Peacock Garden, the Fishing Islands and some other attractions, including a scenic walk.

Sumawan Natural Park 
Sumawan  is also known as Valentine's Bay where couples prefer to take their wedding photos. It can be reached by walking along the Seashore Boardwalk till the end. Sumawan is surrounded by misty mountains except its side where lies the soft sandy beach as well as the clean blue sea. The singing of birds and the rustle of their wings add to Sumawan's natural charm.

Qiansan Islands 

Qiansan Islands lie in the north-east of Lianyun district, consisting of Pingshan Island, Dashan Island and Cheniushan Island. There is a distance of 24 miles between Qiansan Islands and Lian Island. Travelers can take yachts for 2 and a half hours from Lian Island to get to Qiansan Islands.

Statue of Deng Xiaoping 

On the top of Lian Island stands a statue of Deng Xiaoping.

On February 19, 1997, Deng Xiaoping died in Beijing. Ocean is considered where the one with his whole lifetime full of miracles belongs to. On March 2, according to Deng’s the wishes, Present Hu Jintao, together with Deng’s wife Zhuo Lin, memorized this great man in a simple but solemn way by scattering his ashes into the sea the statue is facing.
With a total weight of 6 tons, the statue which is made of high quality bronze is designed by Professor Li Xiangqun from the Statues and Sculptures College of Tsinghua University.

References
 

Islands of Jiangsu
AAAA-rated tourist attractions